Samsas Traum ("Samsa's Dream") is a German rock band fronted by Alexander Kaschte. Their music consists of elements of symphonic metal, Neue Deutsche Härte, black metal and cantastoria. The name is derived from the protagonist Gregor Samsa in Kafka's The Metamorphosis (1915).

Biography 
Samsas Traum started in 1996 when Kaschte released his first solo tape. Three years later the solo project became a group of three, and their official debut Die Liebe Gottes - Eine märchenhafte Black Metal Operette (The Love of God - A fairy tale-like black metal Operetta) divided the scene. Some people said that ST was the best newcomer of the year, other people rather started to hate them, at least also because of some provocative statements by Alexander Kaschte. The follow-up appeared in 2000 with Oh Luna mein (O, Luna mine); a musically matured and varied album of more polished arrangements, balanced instrumentation and choir-parts. In this time Alexander went on to create his darker alter-ego Weena Morloch, which was more noise music based, and included samples from horror movies. Many more Samsas Traum albums have been released each year, with more industrial/classical arrangements. The two new albums which have been released in November 2007 were also heading new and old ways: While the first album Heiliges Herz - Das Schwert Deiner Sonne was most likely a Black Metal-Epos, Wenn schwarzer Regen was an acoustic and very personal one.

The limited first edition of Heiliges Herz ("Sacred Heart") came in a special book format and a slipcase with silver foil embossing. The 44 booklet pages were bound in linen and made of a special paper with a lacquer print and contained lyrics, liner notes, many photos illustrations exclusively done for the album. Additionally there was a bonus CD which contained remixes by In Strict Confidence, L'Âme Immortelle, Pain, P·A·L, Wumpscut and unreleased songs and material from Alexander Kaschte's archives.

Discography

Demos
1996: Kazanian "Die drei Mütter" / Samsas Traum "Nostalgische Atavismen" (demo tape)
1996: Homerecordings (second demo)
1998: Elite (third demo)
1998: Einblick in ein elitäres Debüt-Album (fourth demo)
1999: Wiederveröffentlichung von Kazanian "Die drei Mütter" / Samsas Traum "Nostalgische Atavismen" (re-release)

Albums
 1999: Die Liebe Gottes - Eine märchenhafte Black Metal Operette (Trinity)
 2000: Oh Luna Mein (Trisol)
 2001: Utopia (Trisol)
 2003: Tineoidea oder: Die Folgen einer Nacht - Eine Gothic-Oper in Blut-Moll (Trisol; includes bonus CD)
 2004: a.Ura und das Schnecken.Haus (Trisol; DoCD)
 2005: re-releases of "Die Liebe Gottes", "Oh Luna Mein", "Utopia" and "Tineoidea" (DoCDs)
 2007: Heiliges Herz - Das Schwert Deiner Sonne (Trisol; DoCD)
 2007: Wenn schwarzer Regen (Trisol; DoCD)
 2009: 13 Jahre lang dagegen - Anti bis zum Tod (Trisol)
 2010: Vernunft ist nichts - Gefühl ist alles (Trisol; 3CD+DVD)
 2011: Anleitung zum Totsein (Trisol; DoCD)
 2012: Asen'ka - ein Märchen für Kinder und solche, die es werden wollen (Trisol; DoCD)
 2013: Niemand, niemand anderem als dir (Trisol; DoCD)
 2015: Poesie: Friedrichs Geschichte (Trisol; DoCD)
 2018: Scheiden tut weh (Trisol)

Singles
2005: Einer gegen Alle (Trisol; promo single)
2007: Heiliges Herz (Trisol, promo single)

EPs
2002: Ipsissima Verba (Trisol; EP)
2012: Viva Vienna Vol. I (Trisol; EP) 
2015: Wie das ewige Meer (Trisol; EP)

Best of
2004: Endstation.Eden (Trisol; single/best-of with bonus CD)

Compilations
2001: Nostalgia (Trisol; old album with demo material)
2003: Arachnoidea oder: Von Babalon, Scheiterhaufen und Zerstörungswut - Eine Apokalypse in 23 Tagen (Trisol; remix album of "Tineoidea" with bonus CD)

DVDs
2005: Einer gegen Alle (Trisol; DoDVD & DoCD)

Cover versions 
The band has covered many songs, including:
"Alice" by The Sisters of Mercy
"Gefallen" by L'Âme Immortelle
"Hier kommt Alex" by Die Toten Hosen
"Schwarz" by ASP
"Terra Titanic" by Peter Schilling

See also
Weena Morloch

References

External links 

 Official website
 Official website of Tineoidea
 Official website of a.Ura
 

German rock music groups
German heavy metal musical groups
Musical groups established in 1996
German industrial metal musical groups
German Neue Deutsche Härte music groups